Synchronized may refer to:
Synchronization (US) or synchronisation (UK), the coordination of events to operate a system in unison
Synchronized (album), a 2002 album by Sheavy
Synchronised (horse) (2003–2012), a racehorse
, a programming reserved word that subjects a block of code to mutual exclusion, for thread safety

See also
Synchronic (disambiguation)
Synchronizer (disambiguation)
Synchronization (disambiguation)
Synchrony (disambiguation)